Season 2008–09 saw Clyde compete in their ninth consecutive season in the Scottish First Division. They finished bottom of the league, and were relegated to the Scottish Second Division.

Transfers

Summer

In

Out

January

In

Out

Notable events

May: The club ensure that they will be playing First Division football again after a 3–0 aggregate victory over Airdrie United in the playoff final. Preparations are made for the forthcoming season, with Steven Masterton joining Greenock Morton, Gary Arbuckle, Shaun Fagan and Sean McKenna being released whilst Queen's Park captain Stuart Kettlewell becomes the first summer signing. Keeper Peter Cherrie and winger Dave McKay sign new deals, and youngsters Jordan Murch and Stephen Connolly sign their first professional contracts. Marc McCusker, who was on loan to the club last season, signs a two-year contract following his release from Hearts, whilst Jörg Albertz retires. Jörg Albertz retires.
June: Marc McCusker, who was on loan to the club last season, signs a two-year contract following his release from Hearts. He is shortly joined for Alan Trouten from Queens Park, Ricky Waddell from Airdrie United and ex St Johnstone winger Willie McLaren. Billy Gibson and Marvyn Wilson sign new contracts, whilst all out of contract YTS players are released, including Michael Doherty, the youngest player to play in a competitive match for the club. Mark Brown, of Eddlewood Amateurs, becomes the latest signing, after having scored the winning goal in the 2008 Scottish Amateur Cup Final. Christian Smith leaves the club, along with Slovakian Dušan Bestvina, whose contract has been terminated by mutual consent. Midfield dynamo Jimmy Gibson joins East Stirlingshire.
July: A 20-man squad, including a German trialist, head to Norfolk for their pre-season tour. A 4–0 victory over Great Yarmouth Town, coupled with 2–1 victories over Norwich City and King's Lynn, see the team leave with a 100% record. The Bully Wee return to Rutherglen, their original heartland, to open Rutherglen Glencairn's new stadium. A late Pat Clarke header earns a 1–1 draw. A near capacity crowd at Broadwood Stadium sees Clyde, with special guest players Arthur Numan and Brian Laudrup, along with former Bully Wee midfielder Jorg Albertz, lose narrowly to Rangers. The 1–0 defeat was the first loss of the pre-season. Just before the start of the season, John Brown bolsters his squad further, with the signings of German defender Michael Ohnesorge from SV Elversberg, and striker Scott Gemmill, joining from Berwick Rangers. The first competitive game of the season sees Clyde defeat Annan Athletic 2–0 in their first match as a Scottish Football League side, with Alan Trouten scoring both goals on his debut. The final friendly match sees an understrength Clyde side surprisingly defeat SPL side Hibernian 3–0, in a match to celebrate the 1958 Scottish Cup Final between the two sides.

Squad

Fixtures and results

Friendlies

Scottish First Division

Scottish Challenge Cup

Scottish League Cup

Scottish Cup

Reserve Fixtures

Reserve League Cup

Friendlies

Player statistics

Overall

First Division

Challenge Cup

League Cup

Scottish Cup

Note: Players in italics have left the club

League table

Notes

Clyde F.C. seasons
Clyde